"Born to the Purple" is the third episode of the first season of the science fiction television series, Babylon 5.

Plot
Commander Jeffrey Sinclair is trying to negotiate a treaty between the Narn and Centauri governments over a disputed sector of space, with help of telepath Talia Winters. While Narn ambassador G'Kar cooperates freely, they have trouble drawing Centauri ambassador Mollari from his love interest, an exotic dancer named Adira Tyree. Unknown to them, Adira is a slave owned by Trakis who wants Adira to acquire Mollari's "purple files": files that contain high-level information about the Centauri government. Adira is conflicted between her love for Mollari, and Trakis' threats. She tricks Mollari into drinking a sleeping agent that gives her time to learn his passwords and access the files. However, when she is scheduled to trade them to Trakis, she flees.

Trakis approaches Mollari, convincing him that Adira was working against him, and showing him the papers which give Trakis ownership of Adira as his slave. Feeling scorned, Mollari continues to put off the negotiations in order to look for Adira. Commander Sinclair convinces Mollari to accept his help to search for Adira in exchange for agreeing to his terms. Meanwhile, Trakis hires criminals aboard the station to track down Adira. These men attack Sinclair and Mollari but soon are called off, as Adira has been found by Trakis. Sinclair, with G'Kar and Talia's help, tricks Trakis into revealing where he has kept Adira on the station. Mollari acquires Adira's ownership papers from Trakis and gives them to her. Mollari attempts to convince her to stay aboard Babylon 5 since the threat has passed, but she wants to return to a Centauri world.

Meanwhile, Garibaldi discovers that someone is using the high-priority secure gold channel to make external communications from the station, something that should only be authorized by Sinclair. He approaches Ivanova about it, and she suggests it might be the work of "gremlins". After several failed attempts, each of which has Ivanova suggesting Garibaldi look elsewhere, he manages to catch the channel being used again and finds that it is Ivanova herself speaking with her terminally-ill father. It is his last call to her, apologizing for being a bad father to her and making up to her before he dies. Garibaldi reports to Ivanova that he found that the source of the gold channel use was a computer glitch and has dealt with it, but he offers to buy her a drink later.

Production, visual and sound effects 

The Babylon 5 makeup department involved in this episode – consisting of Everett Burrell, Greg Funk, Mary Kay Morse, Ron Pipes and John Vulich – won the 1994 Emmy Award for Outstanding Individual Achievement in Makeup for a Series for episode 5 of the season, 'The Parliament of Dreams'

Adira was played by Argentine-Italian actress Fabiana Udenio. According to showrunner J. Michael Straczynski, Udenio wore a prosthetic head piece to simulate the largely-bald hairstyle of Centauri women. Straczynski comments, "[T]he one time we  have a bald woman as a background extra, those not in the know on stage kept commenting on how fake the bald-cap looked."  

Trakis was played by New Zealand stage actor Clive Revill, known for his work in musical theatre, and with the Royal Shakespeare Company. Revill also voiced the Emperor Palpatine in the original 1980 version of The Empire Strikes Back.

For its visual effects scenes, Babylon 5 pioneered the use of computer-generated imagery (CGI) scenes – instead of using more expensive physical models – in a television series.<ref name="Britt">{{cite web |url=https://www.syfy.com/syfywire/5-things-babylon-5-did-that-changed-science-fiction-forever |title=5 Things that Babylon 5 did that changed science fiction forever. |last=Britt |first=Ryan |date=11 July 2019 |website=www.syfy.com |publisher=SYFY Media LLC. |access-date= |url-status=dead |archive-url=https://web.archive.org/web/20211009164702/https://www.syfy.com/syfywire/5-things-babylon-5-did-that-changed-science-fiction-forever |archive-date= 2021-10-09 |quote=And though this may seem shocking now, in the early and mid-'90s, CGI was not the default for sci-fi special effects. Most big sci-fi shows and movies (like Star Trek) all still used physical models, which are notoriously more expensive. But all of Babylon 5'''s spaceships and space stations were made in a computer.}}</ref> This also enabled motion effects which are difficult to create using models, such as the rotation of fighter craft along multiple axes, or the rotation and banking of a virtual camera. The visual effects were created by Foundation Imaging using 24 Commodore Amiga 2000 computers with Lightwave 3D software and Video Toaster cards, 16 of which were dedicated to rending each individual frame of CGI, with each frame taking on average 45 minutes to render. In-house resource management software managed the workload of the Amiga computers to ensure that no machine was left idle during the image rendering process.

The Centauri transport ship shown in the episode was created by Foundation Imaging visual effects supervisor Adam "Mojo" Lebowitz, inspired by the design of the Rebel transport ships from The Empire Strikes Back. Lebowitz recalls, "I only designed (and built) one ship, the Centauri transport that looks a bit like a Volkswagon.  I just felt like building a model, I rarely did it and didn't think it was a strength, so it was important to me to give it a go and try to grow as an artist."

Music for the title sequence and the episode was provided by the series' composer, Christopher Franke. Franke developed themes for each of the main characters, the station, for space in general, and for the alien races, endeavoring to carry a sense of the character of each race.
The episode was mixed on 4 October 1993, and aired on 9 February 1994.

Writing
As Babylon 5 was conceived with an overall five-year story arc, the episode was written as both an individual story and with another level, where the hints of the larger story arc were given. The series' creator, J. Michael Straczynski indicates that the episodes can be watched for the individual stories, the character stories, or the story arc.

The episode was written by screenwriter Larry DiTillio, who also contributed to the series Murder, She Wrote along with Straczynski. The original title of the episode was "Amaranth", being later changed to "Born to the Purple".

Reviews
Rowan Kaiser, writing in The A.V. Club, notes that while the episode is not outstanding, it plays an important role is setting up the character of Centauri Ambassador Londo Mollari. Kaiser writes, "Its events are directly referenced later, and they're important to a major character's dramatic arc, but the episode itself is pretty middling." Kaiser continues, "fortunately, the simplicity of the episode's importance also corresponds to the simplicity of its narrative. 'Londo falls in love with an exotic dancer'"

Elias Rosner, writing in Multiversity Comics'', observes, "For all the strengths displayed these last couple episodes, they've all been standalones and continuity-wise, don't really reference each other. [...]The individual, episodic plot threads are less about moving the narrative along and more about moving the characters, redefining them, or giving insight into who they are."

Rosner notes the unusual beginning to Ivanova's character arc: "It's also interesting that this is the place the writers chose to start[...] Not with the knowledge that she's been fighting with her father nor with the knowledge that her father is sick, instead, it's at his death and with their reconciliation. This is usually the end of an arc but here, it's used as the springboard for her own development and it gives us two of this episode's best scenes."

References

External links

Babylon 5 episodes
1994 American television episodes